Way Out West is a rock and roll album recorded and released in June 1966 by film star Mae West. The LP consisted mainly of covers of popular songs of the day. Teen rock band Somebody's Chyldren provided instrumental accompaniment. The album was released by Tower Records, a subsidiary of Capitol Records, and on Stateside Records in the UK.

The album was a surprise success, peaking at #116 on Billboard'''s Hot 200 LP chart although there were no original hit singles from the collection. West was 72 at the time, making her the oldest woman to ever have a solo album on the Hot 200 chart, a long-held record broken in 2011 by Wanda Jackson, then 73, with her The Party Ain't Over release.Way Out West'' was never released on CD, but in 2009 the album was made available in digital format.

Track listing
Source:
Side A

Side B

Charts

References

1966 albums
Tower Records albums
Mae West albums